Thomas James Finlayson MBE, commonly known as Tommy Finlayson (Gibraltar, 1 May 1938), is a Gibraltarian historian. He is also a former cricketer and archivist of the Gibraltar Archives.

He is the eldest brother of Clive Finlayson, the director of the Gibraltar Museum.

Early life

Tommy Finlayson was born in Gibraltar on 1 May 1938. His family, of Scottish descent, have been established on The Rock since the early 19th century. When World War II broke out he was evacuated, as was most of the civilian population of Gibraltar, with his family across the strait to French Morocco. Only a few weeks later, following the defeat of France and the armistice with Germany, the French authorities expelled the evacuees which the War Office then decided to transfer to London via Gibraltar. Finlayson and his family were taken to London aboard the Athlone Castle in July 1940. They lived in the Evacuee Centre at the Empire Pool in Wembley until they were once again relocated to a camp in County Antrim, Northern Ireland in 1944. Still a young boy, Finlayson attended the Gibraltar Grammar School following his repatriation to The Rock, once the war had ended. He later studied at the University of Edinburgh where he obtained an honours MA in history.

Professional career
Finlayson later opted for a career in teaching, which he pursued in the United Kingdom and continued in Gibraltar upon his return in 1980. In 1985, after 25 years of teaching, he was appointed archivist at the Gibraltar Archives by the Government of Gibraltar. He maintained this position from the 1980s to the early 2000s. At the same time, he wrote a number of books and articles on the contemporary history of Gibraltar. The most notable being The Fortress Came First. The story of the civilian population of Gibraltar during the Second World War (1990), which was described as "the definitive work on the wartime evacuation of Gibraltarian civilians".  In 1993 he was awarded the MBE in the Queen's Birthday honours for his contribution to knowledge of the history of Gibraltar. In 2015 he was appointed Honorary Fellow of the Gibraltar Museum and was also awarded Gibraltar's Medallion of Distinction for his services in recording the history of Gibraltar.

Historical works
His works have been devoted to the contemporary history of Gibraltar:

 T J Finlayson Gibraltar Military Fortress or Commercial Colony 2011 | 
 T J Finlayson Gibraltar and the Spanish Shadow 2014
 T J Finlayson   The boundaries of Gibraltar 2018

Cricket
Finlayson has also taken an active part in Gibraltar cricket; as a player, Secretary and formerly Chairman of the Gibraltar Cricket Association. In March 2009 he received the 2008 Lifetime Service Award by International Cricket Council Europe in recognition of his services to cricket in Gibraltar.

References

Gibraltarian historians
Living people
1938 births
Gibraltarian cricketers
Members of the Order of the British Empire
Alumni of the University of Edinburgh